Karmashree Hiteswar Saikia College, established in 1988 and college offer general and major degree. College situated in Guwahati, Assam. This college is affiliated with the Gauhati University. The college offers different bachelor's degree courses in arts and commerce.

References

External links
http://www.khscollege.com/

Universities and colleges in Guwahati
Colleges affiliated to Gauhati University
Educational institutions established in 1988
1988 establishments in Assam